Phi Alpha may refer to:

 Phi Alpha Literary Society, a men's Literary Society founded in 1845 at Illinois College..
 Phi Alpha (fraternity), a historically Jewish Fraternity founded at George Washington University on October 14, 1914 which merged into Phi Sigma Delta in April 1959 (which in turn merged into Zeta Beta Tau).
 Phi Alpha (honor society), an honor society in the field of Social Work founded in 1962.
 Phi Alpha, the motto of social fraternity Sigma Alpha Epsilon